EVC is a gene associated with Ellis–Van Creveld syndrome. It overlaps with the CRMP1 gene.

EVC is one of two genes (the other being EVC2) that upon mutation give rise to EvC (Ellis-van Creveld) syndrome in humans and is found to act as a positive mediator for three hedgehog (Hh) signaling molecules. Mice with an inactivation of the EVC gene (EVC −/−) were found to exhibit similar physical characteristics as humans, such as shortened limbs and dental impairments. In a study of 65 individuals affected with EvC, mutations in the EVC gene were found in 20 of them, and primarily attributed to a frameshift resulting in a nonsense codon. More mild physical characteristics not completely associated with EvC syndrome, such as those without the expected oral deformities can also be attributed to EVC gene mutations.

See also 
 Leucine zipper

References

External links